Thomas Byrne Dunn (March 16, 1853 in Providence, Rhode Island – July 2, 1924 in Rochester, Monroe County, New York) was an American businessman and politician.

Life

He moved with his parents to Rochester, N.Y., in 1858. He founded and was President of the T. B. Dunn Company which manufactured perfumes and extracts. He invented the "breath freshener" Sen-Sen.

He was a member of the New York State Senate (45th D.) in 1907 and 1908.

He was New York State Treasurer from 1909 to 1910, elected at the New York state election, 1908 on the Republican ticket.

He was elected as a Republican to the 63rd, 64th, 65th, 66th and 67th United States Congresses, holding office from March 4, 1913 to March 3, 1923. He was an alternate delegate to the 1920 Republican National Convention.

He was interred in a family mausoleum in Mount Hope Cemetery, Rochester. The Tiffany window from the mausoleum is on display at the Memorial Art Gallery, Rochester.

Sources

External links

1853 births
1924 deaths
Burials at Mount Hope Cemetery (Rochester)
Politicians from Providence, Rhode Island
Politicians from Rochester, New York
New York State Treasurers
Republican Party New York (state) state senators
Republican Party members of the United States House of Representatives from New York (state)
Businesspeople from Rochester, New York